Minuscule 413 (in the Gregory-Aland numbering), ε 420 (in the Soden numbering), is a Greek minuscule manuscript of the New Testament, on parchment. It is dated by a colophon to the year 1302. 
It has marginalia.

Description 

The codex contains a complete text of the four Gospels on 266 parchment leaves. The text is written elegantly in one column per page, in 24 lines per page.

There is also a division according to the Αmmonian Sections (in Mark 241 Sections, the last in 16:20), with references to the Eusebian Canons (written below Ammomnian Section numbers).

Text 

The Greek text of the codex is a representative of the Byzantine text-type. Hermann von Soden classified it to the textual family Kx. Aland placed it in Category V.
According to the Claremont Profile Method it represents textual family Kx in Luke 1, Luke 10, and Luke 20. It creates also a cluster 413.

It contains the Pericope Adulterae (John 7:53-8:11). In John 8:8 it has additional reading ενος εκαστου αυτων τας αμαρτιας  (sins of every one of them) as Codex Nanianus, Minuscule 73, 95, 331, 364, 658, 700, 782, and other manuscripts.

History 

The manuscript was written by Theodosius. It once belonged to the monastery on Sinai peninsula.

Wiedmann and J. G. J. Braun collated some portions of the manuscript for Scholz (1794-1852). The manuscript was added to the list of New Testament manuscripts by Scholz.
C. R. Gregory saw it in 1886.

The manuscript is currently housed at the Biblioteca Marciana (Gr. I. 20) in Venice.

See also 

 List of New Testament minuscules
 Biblical manuscript
 Textual criticism

References

Further reading 

 

Greek New Testament minuscules
14th-century biblical manuscripts
1302 works